The 2010 United States House of Representatives election in American Samoa, for American Samoa's lone At-large congressional district, was held on November 2, 2010. The non-voting delegate to the United States House of Representatives is elected for two-year terms; whoever is elected will serve in the 112th Congress from January 3, 2011 until January 3, 2013.

Incumbent Eni Faleomavaega of the Democratic Party has held the seat since 1989.

Candidates
All elections in American Samoa are officially non-partisan, though candidates do identify with a particular political party. Three candidates sought election for Delegate to the U.S. House in 2010.

Incumbent Rep. Eni Faleomavaega, who identifies with the Democratic Party, is seeking re-election. He was re-elected in the 2008 House election with 60% of the vote.

Amata Coleman Radewagen, American Samoa's Republican National Committeewoman who has challenged Faleomavaega in the past, ran again for the seat.

Tuika Tuika, an accountant and former candidate for Governor of American Samoa in the 2008 gubernatorial election, is the third candidate in the election.

In early February 2010, independent Fualaau Rosie Tago Lancaster had announced that she would seek second bid to become American Samoa's delegate to the United States House. Lancaster announced that she will run on a platform promising an emphasis on Veterans issues, better communication and transportation links with the Manu'a Islands, education, healthcare and economic development. Lancaster came in third in the 2008 House election, receiving 5% of the popular vote. However, she did not appear on the general election ballot in November.

General election
Incumbent Rep. Eni Faleomavaega won election to a 12th two-year term in office, taking 6,895 ballots, or 56.3% of the total vote.

Aumua Amata, who had previously run in 2008, came in second place with 4,438 votes, or 40.5%. Aumua won several election precincts in American Samoa, running especially strong in the Manua Islands.

Tuika Tuika placed third with 357 ballots, or 3.3% of the vote.

References

2010 American Samoa elections
American Samoa
Non-partisan elections
2010